Guabal may refer to:

Guabal, Ecuador
Guabal, Cajamarca, Peru
Guabal, Piura, Peru
Guabal, Panama
El Guabal, Colombia
El Guabal, Dominican Republic